Amityville 1992: It's About Time (released as Curse of Amityville: The Final Chapter in the Philippines) is a 1992 American supernatural horror film directed by Tony Randel and starring Stephen Macht, Shawn Weatherly, Megan Ward, and Damon Martin. It is the sixth film based on The Amityville Horror. It was released direct-to-video in 1992 by Republic Pictures Home Video. In Mexico, the film was released in theaters in 1992.

Plot

Jacob Sterling is an architect who has just returned home from a business trip in Amityville. Jacob lives in Burlwood, California, in a suburban housing development. Jacob's ex-girlfriend, art student Andrea Livingston, is watching Jacob's two teenage kids, naive Lisa and troubled Rusty, while he is gone.

When Jacob returns, he informs them that Amityville wants his company to develop a new neighborhood with a timeless concept. Jacob has also brought home an old mantle clock that he found in the remains of an old house in Amityville. Jacob puts it on the fireplace mantle, stating that it's "what our house has been missing." Once it is on the mantle, things take a turn for the worse. The clock's ticking is incredibly loud; it can be heard upstairs. Unknown to the family, the clock attaches itself to the mantle, preventing it from being moved. But the strangest of all, Rusty goes downstairs in the middle of the night and turns on the living room light switch. Every time he flips the switch, the living room is replaced with an ancient-looking torture chamber. This happens until the lightbulb finally burns out.

The next morning, after Lisa and Rusty leave for school (though we later learn Rusty actually skipped school that day), Jacob decides to go jogging. As he reaches the end of the jog, his digital watch mysteriously stops. He turns around to find his neighbor Mrs. Tetmann and her dog, Peaches, standing there ominously. Mrs. Tetmann lets go of Peaches, and Peaches attacks Jacob, viciously mauling Jacob's leg. Jacob manages to escape by slashing Peaches' face with a broken bottle. The doctor mistakes Andrea for Jacob's wife at the hospital. He tells her that Jacob's wound will have to be cleaned and rebandaged every few hours. Andrea agrees to stay with Jacob for a few more days until he is able to walk. Jacob does not take care of his wounded leg at home and refuses to let Andrea clean it out.

Meanwhile, Rusty (skipping school) visits the neighbor, Iris Wheeler. He tells her about what he saw in the living room last night. She assumes that what Rusty saw was an evil force. It was afraid of Rusty and was trying to win him over. She says it would only go to their home because where it used to be is gone: "It must find a new home." When Rusty gets home, Andrea and him go to Mrs. Tetmann's house to ask if Peaches was vaccinated. Mrs. Tetmann doesn't know what they're talking about and says that she and Peaches never even left the house that day. She even shows them Peaches' face, and there's no trace of a cut. Rusty spends a lot of time thinking about what Iris said.

Jacob, rather than resting, is busy designing a model for a new neighborhood. Andrea asks Rusty to get the phone book from the living room at dinner, which usually only takes a minute or two. However, three hours had passed when Rusty (who was talking the whole time) got back into the kitchen. Lisa lets Andrea have her room for the night, and she sleeps on the couch in the living room. But the loud ticking of the clock keeps Lisa awake all night. Finally, near 3:00 a.m., she asks Andrea if she can sleep with her. Andrea says yes and tells Lisa to get her pillow from the living room. But when Lisa gets her pillow, the living room doors slam shut and lock. In Andrea's room, she hears the door open, and something gets in bed with her. She finds the other side of the bed drenched in black slime. She turns the light on, but it's not there. Andrea goes downstairs and unlocks the living room doors, letting Lisa out. She suspects that Rusty may have locked them, but he tells her he went for a walk.

The next morning, Andrea learns that Peaches was killed the night before, and a swastika has been drawn in blood on Mrs. Tetmann's house. The police suspect that Rusty may have had something to do with it. That night, Andrea's boyfriend Leonard visits and has a hallucination of Jacob interrogating and shooting him with a gun. The next day, Rusty visits Iris' house and tells her what he had seen in his living room and tells her that it all began the night his father had returned home from Amityville. Iris later realizes that the clock is causing everything to go wrong, but on her way to warn Rusty, she is killed by a stork statue that falls from a truck.

Meanwhile, things start to go terribly wrong at the Sterling residence with Lisa's boyfriend Andy melting into the floor, Leonard encountering goo and a zombie that rises out of the bathtub, and Jacob acting aggressively. Both Lisa and Jacob are now under the clock's complete control, and Rusty is forced to kill Lisa in self-defense. Andrea manages to overcome Jacob's attack but learns that the clock de-aged Rusty into a child as he tried to destroy it. Andrea orders the clock to let Rusty leave, and she begins to smash open the wall. As she does, she sees giant clock gears inside the wall and is unable to destroy the clock. As it begins to age her into an old woman, she ignites an exposed gas pipe, causing an explosion.

The clock rewinds back to the first night Jacob brought the clock home. However, Andrea has retained her memories of the events that took place, and this time, she smashes the clock when Jacob comes home with it. When Jacob asks her, "What the hell was that all about?!" she replies, "It's about time, that's what!" As Andrea departs, Rusty sees Iris standing across the street, and the two exchange smiles, hinting that they have retained their memories of what occurred.

Cast

Release
The film was released direct-to-video in the United States on July 16, 1992 by Republic Pictures Home Video and on July 2005 on DVD by Lionsgate, under license from previous rights holder Fremantle. In the Philippines, the film was theatrically released by Jemah Films as Curse of Amityville: The Final Chapter on February 11, 1993.  In 2019, Vinegar Syndrome, under license from Multicom Entertainment Group, released the film on Blu Ray in the US which was included in the boxset, ‘Amityville: The Cursed Collection’. In 2022, the film was released on Blu Ray in the UK courtesy of Screenbound Pictures Ltd.

References

External links

1992 direct-to-video films
1992 films
1992 horror films
1992 independent films
1990s police films
1990s psychological horror films
1990s supernatural horror films
American body horror films
American direct-to-video films
American haunted house films
American independent films
American police films
American psychological horror films
American sequel films
American supernatural horror films
Amityville Horror films
Cultural depictions of Gilles de Rais
Demons in film
Direct-to-video horror films
Direct-to-video sequel films
1990s English-language films
Films about architecture
Films about animal cruelty
Films about dysfunctional families
Films about infidelity
Films about murder
Films about psychiatry
Films about psychic powers
Films about rapid human age change
Films about single parent families
Films about time
Films about time travel
Films about widowhood
Films based on American horror novels
Films directed by Tony Randel
Films scored by Daniel Licht
Films set in 1992
Films set in California
Films shot in Los Angeles
Incest in film
Juvenile delinquency in fiction
Sentient objects in fiction
Sororicide in fiction
Time loop films
1990s American films